"Tortrix" celatrix is a species of moth of the family Tortricidae. It is found in Australia, where it has been recorded from Queensland.

The wingspan is 19–20 mm. The forewings are dark fuscous-brown, finely strigulated with reddish-brown, but the costal edge strigulated with fuscous. The hindwings are whitish, strigulated with grey.

References

Moths described in 1916
Archipini